Bastiaan "Bas" de Gaay Fortman (born 6 November 1937) is a retired Dutch politician and diplomat of the Political Party of Radicals (PPR) and later the GreenLeft (GL) party and economist.

Career before politics
After attending public elementary education, he attended the Christian Gymnasium in the Hague, specialising in sciences. After graduating in 1956 he studied law and economics at the Free University of Amsterdam, receiving his Master of Law, and Doctorandus in Economy in 1963 cum laude. In the last four years of his study he taught Civil Law, Commercial Law and Political Economics. Following graduation he became a fellow at the Social Faculty of the Free University, and wrote his dissertation in Economics. During this period he taught macro- and micro-economic theory. In 1966 he received his Ph.D. in Economics  for his dissertation "Theory of competition policy".

In 1967 De Gaay Fortman left Amsterdam to become a senior lector at the University of Zambia in Lusaka, where he was head of the Economic faculty. Here he taught Economics of Rural Development, and Theory of the Economic Order. In 1968 he was appointed Chairman of the Agricultural Prices and Marketing Committee, an advisory Body of the Zambian government. He wrote two books about his residence in Zambia: "After Mulunguhsi, the economics of Zambian Humanism" in 1967 and "The Third World in Movement, a message from Zambia" in 1972.

While in Zambia De Gaay Fortman kept close tabs on the developments in Dutch politics. De Gaay Fortman was a member of the Christian-democratic Anti-Revolutionary Party. In 1970 he joined a group of so-called "spijtstemmers" (English: "the Sorry Voters") or Americain Group (after restaurant Americain, where the group regularly met). The group regretted that their party, ARP, joined a coalition with the liberal VVD instead of the social-democratic Partij van de Arbeid. In 1967 he edited the book "Christian-Radical", in which a new leftwing Christian faith was articulated. In 1970 he left the ARP to join the PPR, a Christian-radical party set up by former members of the KVP, who also regretted the Christian-democratic/liberal coalition.

Political career
In 1971 De Gaay Fortman returned to the Netherlands from Zambia for the election campaign of the PPR. He was one of the two top candidates of the party. In the elections the party got two seats in the House of Representatives, one of which was to be occupied by De Gaay-Fortman. During his period as member of the House of Representatives, he was Professor Extraordinary of Economic Development at the Institute of Social Studies in the Hague. After the election he became Shadow Minister for International Development in Den Uyl's Shadow cabinet. 
He led the party in the 1972 elections, in which the PPR more than tripled its seats to seven. De Gaay Fortman became the leader of the parliamentary party. Between 1973 and 1975 he was vice-chair of the Defence Committee of the House of Representatives.

He seemed an atypical PPR-member, well-educated, upperclass, and with his affected speech. De Gaay however was very popular under young people. In parliament he showed a keen interest in development cooperation.

Career after politics

Before 1977 elections the younger Ria Beckers succeeded De Gaay Fortman. De Gaay Fortman became a member of the Senate. He kept this position until 1991. During this entire period he was the party's leader in the Senate. After 1981 however his party was a one man's party. In 1989 his party, the PPR merged with the PSP, CPN and the EVP to become GroenLinks. De Gaay Fortman remained senator for this party.

During this period De Gaay Fortman returned to his passion, science. He was professor of Political Economy at the Institute for Social Studies between 1977 and 2002. He also held many positions in the World of Development Cooperation: most importantly he was president of NOVIB, the Dutch branch of Oxfam, between 1977 and 1984. 
In 1990 he gave up his seat in the House of Representatives to become delegate for the Reformed Church at the Assembly of the World Council of Churches in Canberra. In 1990 he also founded Economists for Peace, with the late Jan Tinbergen.

After 1991 Bas de Gaay Fortman has held numerous research positions: from 1991 to 1993 he was the director of research for the Institute for Social Studies. Here he taught Political Economy of Jurisprudence, Transition and Development. In 1992 he served as the chair of the Joint Steering Committee of the Netherlands Israeli Palestinian Research Programme (NIRP). From 1992 to 1998 he was a researcher in both the Research School for Development Studies (CERES) and the Netherlands Research School on Human Rights. From 1992 to 1993 he was the chair of the Directorate of the CERES School of Excellence in which six Dutch universities participated. Since 2000 he has been the chair of the Working Programme Formation and Disintegration of States of CERES.

De Gaay Fortman also served as correspondent in the Netherlands for several development programs, such as the United Nations Development Program and the European Commission's.

In 2002 he became professor of Political Economy of Human Rights at the University of Utrecht. He is the only chair in Political Economy of Human Rights in the world. Until 2005, he taught his trademark class "Political Economy of Human Rights", which was part of the Master in Conflict Studies at University of Utrecht. In this class, the majority of the readings used are his own unpublished works. In 2002 he also became a member of the permanent committee for Development Cooperation of the Advisory Council for International Questions of the Minister of Foreign Affairs. Since 2003 he has been the vice-president of the Prins Claus Chair of the University of Utrecht and the ISS. From 2003 to 2004 he was the Msgr Willy Onclin Professor of Comparative Canon Law at the Catholic University of Louvain.

His research interests focus on the political economy of law, human rights and jurisprudence and political economy of conflict and collective violence.

De Gaay Fortman has written and edited many books on Development Cooperation and many other subjects including: "Help we're developed" in 1978, "The Art of Ivory turning" in 1979, "New Progress" in 1984, "The Small path between Power and Morale" in 1989, "Internal Conflicts, Security and Development" in 1997, "God and Goods. Global Economy in a Civilizational Perspective" in 1998, "Globalization and Its New Divides: Malcontents, Recipes and Reform" in 2003, and "From Warfare to Welfare. Human Security in a Southern African Context" in 2004.

Political views
As a devoted human rights activist, De Gaay Fortman has championed the idea that every human being has human dignity which is meant to convey an idea of absolute and inherent worth.  He outlined the necessary preconditions for broad respect of human dignity through his "Golden Triangle of Human Dignity".  Each corner of the triangle houses one of the three manifestations of human dignity: human security, human rights, and human development.

Miscellaneous facts
De Gaay Fortman adheres to the reformed religion;
He is a member of the de Gaay Fortman family. His father was Gaius de Gaay Fortman, a prominent Dutch politician. Coincidentally his father served as Minister of Home Affairs, while B. de Gaay Fortman served as member of the House of Representatives. After 1977 both W.F. and B. de Gaay Fortman served as members of the Senate together, but representing different political parties;
De Gaay Fortman speaks fluent Dutch, French, English, German, Chewa, Spanish and Afrikaans;
De Gaay Fortman is a well travelled man. As a member of parliament, international observer, researcher or visiting professor, he has visited a lot of countries in South America, Africa and Asia focusing on Zambia and Malawi.

Quotes
 "The Melians, however, do not accept, trusting in the justice of their cause and hoping for the help of the Gods and the Spartans." −2001 unpublished essay on Laborious Law
  "Violations of basic human rights affect the overall quality of life." −1999 unpublished work "Where Needs Meet Rights," pg. 10
 "The lack of a socio-economic perspective, as a result of poverty and exclusion, may be seen as a major factor contributing to intrastate violence" – From his work on the human security gap, "The Golden Triangle of Human Dignity: Human Security, Human Development, and Human Rights."
 "Human rights, then, is to be seen as a laborious, but not impossible, venture and from a civilizational perspective a crucial challenge in our world today." – 2001 unpublished essay on Laborious Law

Decorations

References

External links

Official
  Mr.Dr. B. (Bas) de Gaay Fortman Parlement & Politiek
  Mr.Dr. B. de Gaay Fortman (GroenLinks) Eerste Kamer der Staten-Generaal

 

 

 

 

 

 
 
 

1937 births
Living people
Anti-Revolutionary Party politicians
Dutch anti-poverty advocates
Commanders of the Order of Orange-Nassau
Dutch development economists
Dutch academic administrators
Dutch financial writers
Dutch education writers
Dutch expatriates in Zambia
Dutch human rights activists
Dutch legal writers
Dutch nonprofit directors
Dutch nonprofit executives
Dutch jurists
Dutch political activists
Dutch political writers
GroenLinks politicians
International economists
Academic staff of KU Leuven
Knights of the Order of the Netherlands Lion
Leaders of the Political Party of Radicals
Macroeconomists
Members of the House of Representatives (Netherlands)
Members of the Senate (Netherlands)
Microeconomists
People from Ermelo, Netherlands
Politicians from The Hague
Political economists
Political Party of Radicals politicians
Protestant Church Christians from the Netherlands
Reformed Churches Christians from the Netherlands
Regional economists
Academic staff of the University of Zambia
Academic staff of Utrecht University
Vrije Universiteit Amsterdam alumni
Academic staff of Vrije Universiteit Amsterdam
Writers about activism and social change
20th-century Dutch civil servants
20th-century Dutch diplomats
20th-century Dutch economists
20th-century Dutch educators
20th-century Dutch male writers
20th-century Dutch politicians
Diplomats from The Hague
21st-century Dutch diplomats
21st-century Dutch economists
21st-century Dutch educators
21st-century Dutch male writers